Agelasta bifasciana is a species of beetle in the family Cerambycidae. It was described by White in 1858. It is known from China, India, Laos and Vietnam.

References

bifasciana
Beetles described in 1858